Stigmella floslactella is a moth of the family Nepticulidae. It is found in all of Europe, except the Balkan Peninsula and the Mediterranean islands.

Description
The head is ferruginous-yellowish with a paler collar. Antennal eyecaps are yellow-whitish. Forewings dark fuscous, mixed, or almost wholly suffused with pale ochreous-yellowish ; a pale ochreous-yellowish oblique fascia beyond middle; apical area beyond this dark fuscous, faintly purplish tinged; apical cilia ochreous-white except at base. Hindwings light grey.

Adults are on wing in May and again in August. There are two generations per year.

Occurrences and ecology
Stigmella floslactella occurs in Ireland where it is known to feed on various hornbeam and hazel species, including Corylus advenella. It is considered to be an uncommon visitor to Belgium and the Netherlands, where it feed on Carpinus betulus and Corylus avellana.

Ecology

The larvae feed on Carpinus betulus, Corylus avellana, Corylus maxima and Ostrya carpinifolia. They mine the leaves of their host plant. The mine consists of a slender, gradually widening corridor. The last section is considerably wider than the larva. The trajectory of the mine is not angular and is independent of the leaf venation. Pupation takes place outside of the mine.

References

External links
Swedish moths
 Stigmella floslactella images at  Consortium for the Barcode of Life

Nepticulidae
Moths described in 1828
Moths of Europe